The Afflicted are a punk band (also considered a skate punk band) based in San Francisco, California. They were active from 1982 to 1988, consisting of Dan Rancid (lead vocals and lyrics), Barry Wilder (guitar), Frankie John Lennon (bass), and Daryl Bach (drums).  They gained popularity with a cult classic, "Here Come the Cops" (produced by Daniel Levitin) that was featured on the International P.E.A.C.E. Benefit Compilation, a hardcore punk collection released by R Radical Records.  They released an LP in 1985, also produced by Levitin, Good News About Mental Health, on Infrasonic Records.  The LP featured 11 songs including an updated version of "Here Come the Cops," and covers of Led Zeppelin's "Rock and Roll" and The Velvet Underground's  "Sweet Jane", the latter of which reached the Top 10 for several weeks in 1986 on radio station KUSF.  The album was named one of the Top 10 Records of 1985 by GQ Magazine.  The group were featured for a short-time as recurring characters in the comic books series Nexus, beginning with issue 40 (January 1988). The Band Reunited for Spikefest in 2008 and are planning to tour in 2010.

The original/earliest lineup consisted of Dan Rancid (vocals), Casey Beer (guitar), Matt the Brat (bass) and Darrel Ick (drums). "Here Come the Cops" originated from these four.

External links
The Afflicted at Myspace

Punk rock groups from California
Musical groups from San Francisco